The Arkhangai Province or Arkhangai Aimag ("North Khangai") is one of the 21 aimags of Mongolia. It is located slightly west of the country's center, on the northern slopes of the Khangai Mountains. It is composed of 19 soums.

Geography 
The Arkhangai aimag is located in the interior of the country and borders to the following other aimags: Bulgan (north east), Övörkhangai (south east), Bayankhongor (south), Zavkhan (west), and Khövsgöl (north west).

The highest point is Kharlagtai Peak at 3,529 m (11,578 ft), while the lowest point is the area on the confluence of the Orkhon and Tamir rivers at 1,290 m (4,232 ft). The most well-known mountain is the extinct volcano Khorgo, which is part of the Khorgo-Terkhiin Tsagaan Nuur National Park.

Bodies of water 
The rivers Chuluut, Khanui, and Tamir have their origins in the valleys of the Khangai Mountains. Together with some smaller tributaries they all belong to the watershed of the Selenge. The Orkhon also traverses the eastern end of the aimag for a short stretch.

The lake Terkhiin Tsagaan Nuur is located in the west. According to a legend it was created when a giant took a large rock and threw it away. Looking back he saw a white surface and exclaimed in surprise, "Look, a white lake!" The exclamation has become the name of the lake. The rock ended up farther to the east and is called Taikhar Chuluu. The small lake Ögii Nuur is located in the eastern part of the aimag in the Sum of the same name.

History 
After the People’s Revolution won in 1921 throughout  Mongolia reforms in 
administrative unit were made and the Tsetserleg Mandal Uul  aimag was 
established on the foundation of Sain Noyon Khan aimag. 
Arkhangai aimag was formed from parts of the Tsetserleg Mandal Uul aimag in 1931. At that time, the aimag had 35 sums, 65,333 inhabitants in 22,285 households,  and 1,800,000 head of livestock. The aimag center Tsetserleg was established at the site of the Zaya Khüree monastery, which had been first founded in 1586.

Population 

Arkhangai covers 55,313.82 km² (21,357 sq mi), and had 89,282 citizens in Dec.31 2008, in Dec. 31 2009 89,331 who live in 19 sums and 99 bags (subdistricts)

Transportation 
There are currently no flights to Tsetserleg's airport.  The Post Bus travels daily to Tsetserleg through Kharkhorin, leaving from Dragon Center in Ulaanbaatar at 8:00am 14:00pm and 19:00 pm.  The price of a ticket is around 32,000 MNT.  Small microbuses also travel daily to Tsetserleg, but are much less reliable. Private vehicle hire is around 400,000MNT for a Prius or 500,000MNT for a larger van vehicle

Climate 
In winter mean temperature is −30 °C to −38 °C  (−22 °F to −36 °F) and in summer the highest temperature is between 25 °C and 36 °C (77 °F and 97 °F).

Economy 
The main field of economy in the aimag is agriculture, predominantly animal husbandry. According to 2004 data, the aimag was home to 1,948,000 domestic animals: goats, sheep, cattle (incl. yaks and khainags), horses and camels. Camels are almost exclusively herded in the southeastern sums.

Administrative subdivisions 

The aimag capital Tsetserleg is geographically located in the Bulgan sum in the south of the aimag. It is not to be confused with the Tsetserleg sum in the north. 

* - The aimag capital Tsetserleg

External links

References 

 
Provinces of Mongolia
States and territories established in 1931
1931 establishments in Mongolia